Baldwinholme is a village in Cumbria, England. In 1870-72 the township had a population of 234.

See also

Listed buildings in Orton, Carlisle

References

Villages in Cumbria
City of Carlisle